Andrea Haugen (born Andréa Meyer; July 6, 1969 – October 13, 2021), also known under her artist names of Aghast, Hagalaz' Runedance, Andréa Nebel, Nebel and Nebelhexë, was a German musician and author.

Modelling
Haugen worked as a model in London, but soon rejected it as a "shallow scene". She was later a fetish model and participated in Cradle of Filth shows.

Music
Haugen cited her influences as the Cocteau Twins, Kate Bush, and The Benedictine Monks of Santo Domingo de Silos. She released her first music as Aghast in 1995, then from 1996 to 2002 under the name Hagalaz' Runedance. From 2003 she worked under the name of Nebelhexë, releasing three further albums, and also used the name Andréa Nebel and released electronic horror-mood music as Aghast Manor.

Writing
Haugen began writing in 1995. She wrote film scripts, both horror and satire. Many of her social-critical comments were printed in alternative magazines and also in Norwegian tabloids and magazines; she had a column titled "Seriously - The Things That Irritate Nebelhexë" in a Norwegian gothic magazine. She published an e-book titled Simply Exceptional – How to make it your Way!.

She also wrote Gothic and surreal poetry, and in 2011 released a spoken word CD to accompany her poetry anthology The Dark Side of Dreaming.

A pagan, originally with Anton LaVey's Church of Satan and later an earth-centred Germanic pagan, Haugen criticised what she viewed as patriarchal religions that inhibit people's inner nature. She published a book about Germanic spirituality and mythology, Die alten Feuer von Midgard (English edition The Ancient Fires of Midgard). In 2012 she expressed frustration at some journalists' misconstruing song lyrics of hers as being about "witches in the wood, Nazism, nature, or pollution of the environment" when they were "relatively clearly" about "incest, a friend's suicide, child abuse, or loneliness".

Personal life and death 
Haugen was previously married to guitarist Tomas Haugen; they had a daughter.

She lived in the United Kingdom and Norway; she was living in Kongsberg when she was murdered at the age of 52 in the Kongsberg attacks on 13 October 2021.

Discography

Aghast 
 Hexerei im Zwielicht der Finsternis, CD/PD 1995

Hagalaz' Runedance 
 When the Trees Were Silenced, 7" 1996
 The Winds That Sang of Midgard’s Fate, CD 1998
 Urd – That Which Was, MCD/Picture disc 1999
 On Wings of Rapture, CD single 2000
 Volven, CD/LP/Picture disc 2000
 Frigga’s Web, CD/LP 2002

Nebelhexë 
 Laguz – Within the Lake, CD 2004
 Essensual, CD 2006
 Dead Waters, CD 2009
 Don't Kill The Animals, EP, 2009, with US artist Jarboe

 Andréa Nebel 
 The Dark Side Of Dreaming, CD 2011

 Aghast Manor 
 Gaslights, CD 2012
 Penetrate, CD 2013

 Guest appearances 
 Cradle of Filth – The Principle of Evil Made Flesh 1994 (credited as 'Andrea Meyer').
 Satyricon – Nemesis Divina 1996

 Bibliography 
 Understanding the Northern Myths and Traditions (2000)
 Dark Side of Dreaming – poems and short stories Walking With The Night – a book of shadows Feed My Shadow Nature Simply Exceptional The Shadow Of Eloise The Neighbour The Body In The Skeleton House Behind Church Walls Das Erbe der Familie Rimbaud''

See also
 Neopagan music

References

External links 
 Nebelhexë homepage
 Official myspace entry

1969 births
2021 deaths
2021 murders in Norway
Cradle of Filth members
German occultists
German multimedia artists
German industrial musicians
German non-fiction writers
German heavy metal musicians
Female murder victims
People murdered in Norway
Deaths by stabbing in Norway
German women artists
German women writers
German modern pagans
Modern pagan writers
Adherents of Germanic neopaganism
Performers of modern pagan music
Musicians from Hanover
German people murdered abroad
Mass murder victims
Women in metal